James Boydston Lawrence (March 15, 1913 – May 17, 1990) was an American football player. He was drafted in the first round with the fifth overall pick in the 1936 NFL Draft. He played professionally in the National Football League (NFL) for the Chicago Cardinals and the Green Bay Packers. After starting the 1939 season with the Cardinals, he moved to the Green Bay Packers. A member of the 1939 NFL Champion Packers, he played in the annual All-Star Game that year. He played at the college football at Texas Christian University (TCU).

See also
 List of Green Bay Packers players

References

External links
 NFL.com player page

1913 births
1990 deaths
American football halfbacks
Chicago Cardinals players
Green Bay Packers players
TCU Horned Frogs football players
People from Dawson, Texas
People from Harlingen, Texas
Players of American football from Texas